Robert Farrar is a British writer.

Robert Farrar may also refer to:

Robert Farrar (MP) (died 1572/76), English politician

See also

Robert Ferrar (died 1555), bishop
Robert Ferrers (disambiguation)